Blue Collar Conservatives are a pressure group and caucus of Conservative Party Members of Parliament who identify as working class conservatives. It was founded in 2012 by former cabinet minister Esther McVey and a former conservative parliamentary candidate for Workington, Clark Vasey. It was relaunched at the beginning of the 2019 Conservative Party leadership election by Esther McVey, Ben Bradley, the MP for Mansfield since 2017, and Scott Mann, the MP for North Cornwall since 2015. The relaunch was reported to have rivalled the recent establishment of the One Nation Conservatives. 

As a group, they aim to "champion working people and develop a conservative agenda to benefit the voters and communities most neglected by Labour". In the weeks prior to becoming Prime Minister, Boris Johnson said, "the blue-collar conservatism agenda – particularly in relation to supporting schools, police and other public services [...] is something I've already signalled I want to take forward in government." The New Statesman has described the caucus as an influential grouping within the parliamentary party.

In October 2022, Esther McVey stood down as chair and was replaced by Lee Anderson.

Campaigns 
The group focus their campaigning on empowering blue-collar workers and other working-class people. They have also campaigned on Brexit, public services, Education in the United Kingdom and law enforcement. The values of the caucus focus on "Conservative Values, Practical Delivery" and were attributed to the result of the 2019 general election, where the Conservatives won many seats in the "Red wall".

Many in the caucus have supported cancelling High Speed 2.

Leadership

Board members 

 Esther McVey MP, president and founder
 Ben Bradley MP, chairman
 Councillor Clark Vasey, director
 Dehenna Davison MP, vice chair
 Scott Mann MP, vice chair
 Eddie Hughes MP, vice chair
 John Stevenson MP, vice chair
 Lee Rowley MP, vice chair
 Andrea Jenkyns MP, vice chair
 Andrew Lewer MP, vice chair
 Sir Gary Streeter MP, vice chair

Membership 
According to the group's website; the members/supporters of the caucus include:

Blue Collar Conversations: from pub to podcast 

Since its relaunch, the group travelled to pubs across the country holding open events called 'Blue Collar Conversations' in which UK cabinet ministers and MPs discussed ideas and policies in an informal setting with members of the public. Speaking at one of those events, a member of the group is reported to have said: "The party needs to adopt the blue-collar Conservatism approach – travel to pubs across the country and reach out to the people… a pub-ocracy!"

The group then launched a weekly podcast of the same name as the United Kingdom went into official lockdown from the coronavirus pandemic. The podcast is described as "a space to champion working people". New episodes are released every Sunday and cover a range of topical issues, from crime and justice to care homes and football, and the cosmetic industry to education. The podcast is hosted by Esther McVey and guests have included Nick Knowles, Ching He Huang, Toby Young, Linda Yueh, Tom Harwood, Chris Wright, Mark Radcliffe and Bradford City A.F.C.; however, the podcast prides itself on also providing a platform for everyday working people.

References

External links 

 Official website/

See also 

 Social class in the United Kingdom

2012 establishments in the United Kingdom
Brexit
Conservative Party (UK) factions
Euroscepticism in the United Kingdom
Groups of British MPs
Organisations associated with the Conservative Party (UK)
Political organizations established in 2019
Right-wing politics in the United Kingdom
Right-wing populism in the United Kingdom